The men's points race at the 2019 European Games was held at the Minsk Velodrome on 28 June 2019.

Results
160 laps (40 km) were raced with 16 sprints.

References

Men's points race